Big Sir may refer to:

Big Sir (comics), a fictional DC Comics character
Big Sir (band), American band
Big Sir (album), a 2001 album by Big Sir
 Misspelling of Big Sur, a region of the central California coast

See also
Big Sur (disambiguation)